Bruce Borland (November 4, 1958 – October 25, 1999) was an American golf course designer who worked for Jack Nicklaus. He died in the 1999 South Dakota Learjet crash on October 25, 1999 while traveling with golf Hall of Famer Payne Stewart.

Early life and education
Bruce Borland was raised in the Peoria, Illinois, area. He took a fascination with golf at an early age, building and maintaining a putting green in his parents' backyard, tending to it meticulously. Borland went on to graduate from the University of Illinois at Urbana-Champaign, with a degree in Landscape Architecture.

Career
After graduation, he moved to the Chicago area and began designing golf courses for several firms.

In 1989, Borland opened his own design firm, ProDesign, just a year later he was offered a design position with Jack Nicklaus at Golden Bear International. Borland worked on many of the famous Jack Nicklaus "Signature" golf courses, as well as other stateside and Indonesian courses.

Over his career, Borland designed or worked on several golf courses.

Death
In 1999, Borland was killed in a Learjet 35 with Payne Stewart while flying from Orlando, Florida, to Dallas, Texas before the Tour Championship. He died of hypoxia, a lack of oxygen, before the plane crashed.

Bruce left behind his wife, Kate Borland, and children Daniel, Thomas, Benjamin and Elizabeth.

References

External links
 US NTSB Report on airplane crash

1958 births
1999 deaths
Golf course architects
Victims of aviation accidents or incidents in 1999
Victims of aviation accidents or incidents in the United States
University of Illinois College of Fine and Applied Arts alumni
Artists from Peoria, Illinois
Deaths from hypoxia
Accidental deaths in South Dakota